Wilsele is a part of the city of Leuven, Flemish Brabant, Flanders, Belgium.

The Canal Leuven-Dijle which runs from Leuven to Mechelen passes through Wilsele and separates this part of Leuven into two parts: Wilsele-Dorp (Wilsele-Village) and Wilsele-Putkapel. Due to the physical separation, both parts have gone their own way for many years. Only recently Leuven has opened a bridge over the canal.

The central area of Wisele is situated between Wilsele-Dorp and Wilsele-Putkapel. There is a partial town hall, subsidiary site of the city library and police, as well as a sports and cultural centre. Also the presence of the Centrumstraat (Centre Street) opposite to the town hall is a witness of the past of this part as the village centre.

Part of Wilsele is located on the Keizersberg ("Emperor's Hill") or Boellenberg. The Keizersberg is the site of a beautiful abbey. The abbey houses many students from Leuven.

References

External links

Sub-municipalities of Leuven
Populated places in Flemish Brabant